Carola Anding (née Jacob; born 29 December 1960) is a former East German cross-country skier who competed during the early 1980s. She won a gold medal in the 4 × 5 km relay at the 1980 Winter Olympics in Lake Placid, New York.

Anding also won a bronze medal in the 4 × 5 km relay at the 1982 FIS Nordic World Ski Championships.

Cross-country skiing results
All results are sourced from the International Ski Federation (FIS).

Olympic Games
 1 medal – (1 gold)

World Championships
 1 medal – (1 bronze)

World Cup

Season standings

Individual podiums
 1 podium

Team podiums
 1 podium

Note:   Until the 1999 World Championships, World Championship races were included in the World Cup scoring system.

References

External links
 
 World Championship results 
 
 

1960 births
Living people
People from Schmalkalden-Meiningen
People from Bezirk Suhl
German female cross-country skiers
Sportspeople from Thuringia
Cross-country skiers at the 1980 Winter Olympics
Cross-country skiers at the 1984 Winter Olympics
Olympic gold medalists for East Germany
Olympic medalists in cross-country skiing
FIS Nordic World Ski Championships medalists in cross-country skiing
Medalists at the 1980 Winter Olympics
Recipients of the Patriotic Order of Merit in silver
20th-century German women